William McCormack (27 April 1879 – 21 November 1947) was Premier of Queensland, Australia, from 1925 to 1929.

Early life 
McCormack was born on 27 April 1879 in St Lawrence, Queensland. He was the fourth of six children born to Mary (née Brennan) and Patrick McCormack; his mother was born in Ireland. His father owned a small grazing property, having previously worked as a carrier.

McCormack was educated at a local state school and subsequently worked as a prospector in the area around Mount Morgan. He moved to North Queensland in 1904 and worked on the Stannary Hills Tramways. He developed a friendship with Ted Theodore who introduced him to the labour movement. In 1908, McCormack became the inaugural vice-president of the Amalgamated Workers' Association of North Queensland (AWA). He led successful industrial action on the Etheridge railway line and oversaw a rapid increase in membership.

In 1909, McCormack was elected as the full-time paid secretary of the AWA, having been blackballed by employers due to his union activities. He became "North Queensland's most influential industrial leader", working towards amalgamations of smaller unions in line with the One Big Union ideal. He led a successful strike of sugar workers in 1911, reaching a favourable settlement on wages and employment conditions. He initially lent support to the 1912 Brisbane general strike, but considered the pretext for the strike to be flimsy and soon withdrew, gaining a reputation for pragmatism. The AWA merged into the Australian Workers' Union (AWU) in 1913 with McCormack becoming a vice-president of the AWU.

Politics 
McCormack entered politics as member for Cairns in the Queensland Legislative Assembly at the election of 1912, a seat he held until his retirement from politics in 1930.

After the 1915 state election, McCormack missed out upon a place in the ministry but was instead elected Speaker of the Legislative Assembly. He held the position until 1919 and then was appointed home secretary in Ted Theodore's government. In 1923 he instead became secretary of public lands.

In February 1925, McCormack was defeated by William Gillies in the ballot to succeed Theodore as ALP leader and premier. However, Gillies lasted only eight months in the position and was succeeded by McCormack in October 1925. He led the ALP to victory at the 1926 state election.

Later life 

McCormack died in Brisbane on 21 November 1947 and was buried at the Toowong Cemetery. His funeral cortege proceeded from his Annerley residence to the cemetery.

References

1879 births
1947 deaths
Australian Labor Party members of the Parliament of Queensland
Premiers of Queensland
Burials at Toowong Cemetery
Deputy Premiers of Queensland
Speakers of the Queensland Legislative Assembly
Treasurers of Queensland
Australian trade unionists
Australian miners